The Max Jakob Memorial Award recognizes an 'eminent scholarly achievement and distinguished leadership' in the field of heat transfer. Awarded annually to a scholar by the American Society of Mechanical Engineers (ASME) and the American Institute of Chemical Engineers (AIChE), it is the highest honor in the field of heat transfer these professional organizations bestow.

The award was established in 1961 by the American Society of Mechanical Engineering Heat Transfer Division in honor of Max Jakob, a pioneer in the science of heat transfer, commemorating his influential contributions as a research worker, educator, and author. In 1962, the AIChE joined the ASME in presenting the award. It is administered though the Max Jakob Memorial Award Committee, a board composed of three members from each of the two major professional organizations, as well as the Past Chair of the committee.

The award is presented annually, without regard to society affiliation or nationality. It consists of a bronze plaque, an engraved certificate, an honorarium, and travel expenses to accept the award. Each year the recipient also presents the Max Jakob Award Lecture as part of the annual America Society of Mechanical Engineering National Heat Transfer Conference.

Recipients

 2019 Sir David McMurtry, United States
 2018 John W. Rose, United Kingdom
 2016 Je-Chin Han, United States
 2014 P. S. Ayyaswamy, United States
 2010 Amir Faghri, United States
 2009 Ivan Catton, United States
 2008 Suhas Patankar, United States
 2007 Wen-Jei Yang, United States
 2006 Kwang-Tzu Yang, United States
 2005 Ping Cheng, China
 2004 Vijay K. Dhir, United States
 2003 Kenneth J. Bell, United States
 2002 Yogesh Jaluria, United States
 2001 John C. Chen, United States
 2000 Vedat Arpaci, United States
 1999 Adrian Bejan, United States
 1998 Alexander I. Leontiev, Russia
 1997 John R. Howell, United States
 1996 Robert Siegel, United States
 1995 Arthur E. Bergles, United States
 1994 Geoffrey F. Hewitt, United Kingdom
 1993 Benjamin Gebhart, United States
 1992 William M. Kays, United States
 1991 Franz X. Mayinger, Germany
 1990 Richard J. Goldstein, United States
 1989 James P. Hartnett, United States
 1988 Yasuo Mori, Japan
 1987 S. George Bankoff, United States
 1986 Raymond Viskanta, United States
 1985 Frank Kreith, United States
 1984 Alexander Louis London, United States
 1983 Bei Tse Chao, United States
 1982 Simon Ostrach, United States
 1981 Chang-Lin Tien, United States
 1980 Ralph A. Seban, United States
 1979 Stuart W. Churchill, United States
 1978 Niichi Nishiwaki, Japan
 1977 D. Brian Spalding, United Kingdom
 1976 Ephraim M. Sparrow, United States
 1975 Robert G. Deissler, United States
 1974 Peter Grassmann, Switzerland
 1973 Ulrich Grigull, Germany
 1972 Karl A. Gardner, United States
 1971 James W. Westwater, United States
 1970 Warren M. Rohsenow, United States
 1969 Samson Kutateladze, U.S.S.R.
 1968 Shiro Nukiyama, Japan
 1967 Thomas B. Drew, United States
 1966 Sir Owen Saunders, United Kingdom
 1965 Hoyt C. Hottel, United States
 1964 Ernst Schmidt, Germany
 1963 William H. McAdams, United States
 1962 Llewellyn M.K. Boelter, United States
 1961 Ernst R. G. Eckert, United States

See also

 List of engineering awards
 List of mechanical engineering awards

References

External links
"Max Jakob Memorial Award - ASME Heat Transfer Division (HTD)"
"Max Jakob Memorial Award Charter"
"American Society of Mechanical Engineers"
"American Institute of Chemical Engineers"

Awards of the American Society of Mechanical Engineers
Awards of the American Institute of Chemical Engineers